Bosz is a Dutch surname. Notable people with the surname include:

 Gino Bosz (born 1993), Dutch football player, son of Peter and brother of Sonny
 Peter Bosz (born 1963), Dutch football manager and player
 Sonny Bosz (born 1990), Dutch football player

Dutch-language surnames